Sir Eric Frank Scowen  (22 April 1910 – 23 November 2001) was an English physician and professor of medicine.

Biography
After education at the City of London School he entered in 1926 St Bartholomew's Hospital Medical School, qualifying MRCP in 1931 and graduating MB BS (Lond.) in 1932. At St Bartholomew's Hospital he was a house physician under Francis Richard Fraser. Scowen graduated MD (Lond.) in 1935. He was briefly chief assistant at the Royal Brompton Hospital. In 1936 at St Bartholomew's Hospital Scowen was appointed an assistant physician and also assistant director of the medical unit. In 1937 Scowen was awarded a Rockefeller Fellowship and studied endocrinology with Philip Edward Smith at Columbia University in Manhattan and with James Howard Means and Fuller Albright at Massachusetts General Hospital in Boston. In 1938 Scowen returned to St Bartholomew's Hospital as a reader in medicine. During WWII he lived in the centre of London and worked at St Bartholomew's Hospital, helping to organise the hospital's fire-fighting and air-raid protection. There he was appointed in 1945 an assistant physician, in 1955 a director of the medical professorial unit, and in 1961 a professor of medicine, retiring in 1975. He graduated DSc in 1962.

In 1977 he became chair of the council of the Imperial Cancer Research Fund and continued there for many years, promoting the establishment of a number of Chairs of Medical Oncology outside London. He was a founder of King’s College London's Centre of Medical Law and Ethics and was made a Fellow of King’s College London.

Awards and honours
 1941 — Fellow of the Royal College of Physicians (FRCP)
 1960 — Fellow of the Royal College of Physicians (FRCS)
 1965 — Lumleian Lecturer on Cystinuria
 1965 — Fellow of the Royal College of Physicians of Edinburgh  (FRCPE)
 1965 — Fellow of the Royal College of Pathologists (FRCPath)
 1973 — Knighthood
 1984 — Fellow of the Royal Pharmaceutical Society (FRPharmS)
 1989 — Fellow of the Royal College of General Practitioners (FRCGP)
 2001 — Honorary Fellowship of King's College London

References

1910 births
2001 deaths
People from East Ham
20th-century English medical doctors
People educated at the City of London School
Alumni of the Medical College of St Bartholomew's Hospital
Fellows of the Royal College of Physicians
Fellows of the Royal College of Physicians of Edinburgh
Fellows of the Royal College of Surgeons
Fellows of King's College London
Knights Bachelor